South Para Reservoir is the second largest reservoir in South Australia, behind Mount Bold Reservoir, and the principal reservoir of the South Para River system. The reservoir's large capacity of around 45,330 megalitres and its location in the catchment area mean that it only ever fills completely once in every five years.

Costing A$6.4 million, the reservoir took almost a decade to construct, between 1949 and 1958, due to a demand on resources in the post-war boom. The building of the historic Mannum–Adelaide pipeline from the River Murray to the water-short city of Adelaide was a key delay in South Para's construction; that pipeline today disperses water into the reservoir.

The Reservoir is surrounded by nature reserve and has been a focus for two major revegetation projects, the first in the late 1950s when over 5000 trees and shrubs were planted, and the second as part of the South Australian Government's "Million Trees" initiative.

In 1979 the mutilated body of 17-year-old Alan Barnes was found after being dumped in the South Para Reservoir. His murder, one of the five cases known as The Family Murders remains unsolved.
Capacity: 45,330 ML
Length of wall: 284 m
Height of wall: 44.2 m
Type of wall: rolled fill

Gallery

See also
List of reservoirs and dams in Australia

References

External links
SA Water: Water Storage (Reservoirs)
ParksWeb: SA Water Reserves

Dams completed in 1958
Dams in South Australia
Reservoirs in South Australia